The Light welterweight competition at the 2013 AIBA World Boxing Championships was held from 15–26 October 2013. Boxers were limited to a weight of 64 kilograms.

Medalists

Seeds

  Éverton Lopes (semifinals)
  Uranchimegiin Mönkh-Erdene (semifinals)
  Armen Zakaryan (third round)
  Branimir Stanković (second round)
  Merey Akshalov (champion)
  Manoj Kumar (quarterfinals)
  Abdelkader Chadi (third round)
  Evaldas Petrauskas (quarterfinals)
  Dmitrijs Galagot (third round)
  Heybatulla Hajialiyev (second round)

Draw

Finals

Top half

Section 1

Section 2

Bottom half

Section 3

Section 4
{{16TeamBracket-Compact-NoSeeds-Byes
| RD1=First Round
| RD2=Second Round
| RD3=Third Round
| RD4=Quarterfinals

| team-width=150
| score-width=25

| RD1-team03= Artur Kirajyan
| RD1-score03=1
| RD1-team04= Yauheni Dauhaliavets
| RD1-score04=2

| RD1-team05= Gilbert Choombe
| RD1-score05=0
| RD1-team06=
| RD1-score06=3

| RD1-team07= Dennis Galvan
| RD1-score07=0
| RD1-team08= Heybatulla Hajialiyev
| RD1-score08=3

| RD1-team09= Ayrin Ismetov
| RD1-score09=2
| RD1-team10= Johan Méndez
| RD1-score10=1

| RD1-team11= Vyacheslav Kyslytsyn
| RD1-score11=
| RD1-team12= Igor Lazarev
| RD1-score12=TKO

| RD1-team13= Tuolewuta Sairike
| RD1-score13=1
| RD1-team14= Aziz Bebitov
| RD1-score14=2

| RD2-team01= Abdelkader Chadi
| RD2-score01=3
| RD2-team02= Yauheni Dauhaliavets
| RD2-score02=0

| RD2-team03= Sanjarbek Rakhmanov
| RD2-score03=3
| RD2-team04= Heybatulla Hajialiyev
| RD2-score04=0

| RD2-team05= Ayrin Ismetov
| RD2-score05=3
| RD2-team06= Igor Lazarev
| RD2-score06=0

| RD2-team07= Aziz Bebitov
| RD2-score07=0
| RD2-team08=

References
Draw

2013 AIBA World Boxing Championships